25 Cats Name Sam and One Blue Pussy is a privately printed, limited edition artist's book by the American artist Andy Warhol in 1954.

It consists of 19 lithographs that were hand-colored with watercolor by the artist and his friends. His mother Julia Warhola did the calligraphy, and is responsible for the dropped “d” in the title, which Warhol chose to preserve. Between 150 and 190 copies were made, to be given to friends and family.

Facsimile editions were published in 1987 (which reproduced the colors of copy 4) and 1988. Both facsimiles came in a slipcase with a volume of Holy Cats by Julia Warhola, a work she first created in 1960, advertising her own authorship as “Andy Warhol’s Mother.”

References 

1954 books
Artists' books
Books by Andy Warhol
Cats in art